Gerardus "Geer" van Velde (5 April 1898, Lisse – 5 March 1977, Cachan, Paris) was a Dutch painter.

Biography

Early life 
Van Velde was the second son of Willem Adriaan van Velde, then owner of a small case of inland waterway transport fuelwood and charcoal on the Rhine and Hendrika Catharina von der Voorst, illegitimate daughter of an earl. Catharina and her four children (Neeltje, Bram, Geer, and Jacoba) were abandoned by Willem Adriaan after the bankruptcy of his business, leaving them in misery.  Moving a lot, they eventually moved to The Hague in 1903.  In 1910, at the age of twelve, Geer became an apprentice designer in the firm with Schaijk & Eduard H. Kramers. Kramers encouraged Geer to develop his interest in painting, as he did with his brother Bram van Velde.

1898 births
1977 deaths
Abstract painters
People from Lisse
20th-century Dutch painters
Dutch male painters
20th-century Dutch male artists